Palestine Electric Company may refer to:
Israel Electric Company, originally founded as Palestine Electric Company in 1926, later renamed into its current name;
Jerusalem District Electricity Company, de facto being the largest electricity supplier to Palestinians in the West Bank;
Palestine Electric Company PLC, the company holding the Nissirat power plant in the Gaza Strip